Mechanitis menapis, the Menapis tigerwing or variable tigerwing, is a species of butterfly of the family Nymphalidae. It was described by William Chapman Hewitson in 1856. It is found in South America.

The larvae feed on Solanum species, including S. hispidum and S. torvum.

Subspecies

M. m. menapis (Colombia)
M. m. caribensis Fox, 1967 (Venezuela)
M. m. dariensis Brown, 1977 (Panama)
M. m. doryssus Bates, 1864 (Guatemala, Mexico, Panama)
M. m. mantineus Hewitson, 1869 (Ecuador: western Andes)
M. m. occasiva Fox, 1967 (Colombia)
M. m. saturata Godman, 1901 (Mexico, Panama, Costa Rica)

References

Ithomiini
Butterflies of Central America
Nymphalidae of South America
Butterflies described in 1856
Taxa named by William Chapman Hewitson